Talkhon Hamzavi (born 1979) is an Iranian-Swiss film director and screenwriter. For her work, Parvaneh, she was nominated for an Oscar for Best Live Action Short Film at the 87th Academy Awards along with Stefan Eichenberger.

Filmography

As director:
 2012 - Parvaneh
 2010 - Taub
 2009 - Es ist normal, verschieden zu sein
 2007 - Der süsse kalte Hauch
 2004 - Wenn der Schleier fällt

References

External links 
 

1979 births
Living people
Student Academy Award winners
Iranian diaspora film people